"I'm Moving On" is a 1950 country standard written by Hank Snow. It was a success in the record charts and has been recorded by numerous musicians in a variety of styles.

Recording and lyrics
According to Snow, he proposed the song for his first session for RCA Records in 1949, but recording director Stephen H. Sholes turned it down. "Later on, in the spring of 1950, in Nashville, Mr. Sholes had not remembered the song, so I recorded it," Snow recalled.

The song has four bars of verse followed by eight bars of chorus with the final lines referring back to the verse:

Charts and critical reception
The single reached number one on the Billboard country singles chart and stayed there for 21 weeks, tying a record for the most weeks atop the chart. It was the first of seven number-one Billboard country hits Snow scored throughout his career on that chart. The song's success led to Snow joining the Grand Ole Opry cast in 1950.

According to music writer John Morthland, "The chugging beat establishes that this is a train song, and the fiddle and steel push harder than is usual on Nashville records from this era... There's real anger and determination in Snow's voice, which sometimes sounds too smooth for this type of song."

Charting versions
Ray CharlesIn 1959, a version by Ray Charles reached number forty on the Billboard Hot 100 singles chart and number eleven on the R&B singles chart.  Charles's version with his soul band featured congas and maracas, giving the Spanish tinge to a country and western blues. It was recorded on June 26, 1959, at his last recording session with Atlantic Records, months before he signed with ABC. Produced by Jerry Wexler, Charles provides the lead vocals, and is backed by the Raelettes. The Ray Charles Orchestra provided the instrumentation.
Don Gibsonreached No. 14 on the Billboard Hot Country Singles chart with a recording of the song in 1960.
Matt LucasIn June 1963, his Smash Records single reached No. 56 on the Hot 100.
The Rolling Stones recorded the song for their EP Got Live If You Want It! in 1965. Their version charted in Sweden, reaching No. 3 on Tio i Topp and No. 7 on Kvällstoppen.
Emmylou HarrisRecorded an uptempo live version of "I'm Moving On" which reached No. 5 on the Hot Country Singles chart.

References

1950 singles
1959 singles
1983 singles
Hank Snow songs
Ray Charles songs
Don Gibson songs
Emmylou Harris songs
Big House (band) songs
Terri Clark songs
Dean Brody songs
Al Hirt songs
Elvis Presley songs
Billboard Hot Country Songs number-one singles of the year
Grammy Hall of Fame Award recipients
RCA Victor singles
Warner Records singles
Songs written by Hank Snow
1950 songs
Song recordings produced by Stephen H. Sholes